Kamal Nath (born 18 November 1946) is an Indian politician who served as the 18th Chief Minister of Madhya Pradesh for approximately 15 months and resigned after a political crisis. He was the Leader of the Opposition in the Madhya Pradesh Legislative Assembly from March 2020 to April 2022.

As a leader of the Indian National Congress he has served as the Minister of Urban Development. He is one of the longest serving and most senior members of the Lok Sabha, the lower house of India's bicameral Parliament. He was appointed the Pro Tem Speaker of the 16th Lok Sabha. He has been elected nine times from the Chhindwara Lok Sabha constituency of Madhya Pradesh. Nath was elected president of the Madhya Pradesh Congress Committee in May 2018, leading the party in the November–December 2018 assembly election. He assumed the office of Chief Minister on 17 December 2018 and resigned on 20 March 2020 due to lack of majority in government.

Early life
Kamal Nath was born in Kanpur in a business family. His father Mahendra Nath established firms involved with exhibition and distribution of films, publishing, trading power transmission. Kamal is an alumnus of The Doon School. Later, he was graduated in Commerce from the St. Xavier's College, Kolkata.

Career

Political career

Nath was first elected to the 7th Lok Sabha in 1980. He was re-elected to the 8th Lok Sabha in 1984, the 9th Lok Sabha in 1989, and the 10th Lok Sabha in 1991.
He was inducted into the Union Council of Ministers as Union Minister of State (Independent Charge) of Environment and Forests in June 1991. From 1995 to 1996 he served as Union Minister of State (Independent Charge) of Textiles.

Nath was elected to the 12th Lok Sabha in 1998 and the 13th Lok Sabha in 1999. From 2001 to 2004, he was the General Secretary of the Indian National Congress (INC). He was re-elected to the 14th Lok Sabha in the 2004 elections and served as Union Cabinet Minister of Commerce and Industry from 2004 to 2009.

On 16 May 2009 he again won the elections from his constituency for the 15th Lok Sabha and re-entered the Cabinet, this time as Union Minister of Road Transport and Highways. In 2011, as a result of a cabinet reshuffle, Nath replaced Jaipal Reddy to take on the role of Minister of Urban Development.

In October 2012 Nath was confirmed to the Ministry of Parliamentary Affairs in addition to his current role as Minister of Urban Development.

In late 2012 Nath replaced Pranab Mukherjee to help the United Progressive Alliance (UPA) government win a crucial debate on foreign direct investment in India (FDI). Nath also replaced Minister of Rural Development Jairam Ramesh as an ex officio member of the Planning Commission in December 2012.

From 4 to 5 June 2014 Kamal Nath was the only member to have taken the official oath as a member of the newly elected 16th Lok Sabha, and was made the Pro Tem Speaker. The first day of the Lok Sabha, on which the Pro Tem Speaker normally administers the oath to all other elected members, was interrupted by the death of Union Cabinet Minister of Rural Development Gopinath Munde. The House was adjourned after paying tribute to Munde and observing a two-minute silence. Since no other elected member had taken the oath that day, they were not officially members of parliament.

On 13 December 2018, Kamal Nath was elected as the Chief Minister of Madhya Pradesh after the INC emerged as the single largest party with 114 seats.

On 28 April 2022, Kamal Nath stepped down from his position as Leader of Opposition in the Madhya Pradesh Assembly.

Political associations
Kamal Nath is a member of the INC (Indian National Congress) political party and served as general secretary from 2001 to 2004.

Nath has close ties with the Nehru–Gandhi family, being young friends and schoolmates with Sanjay at the Doon School, an independent boarding school located in Dehradun.

Business career
Kamal Nath serves as president of the board of governors for The Institute of Management Technology (IMT) a management institution.

He is Chairman of "Madhya Pradesh Child Development Council" and Patron to the Bharat Yuvak Samaj (Youth Wing of All India Bharat Seva Samaj).

Political views

Economic development
Nath is a strong proponent of economic development in India. At the World Economic Forum (WEF) Davos, Switzerland in 2011 Nath shared his views on improving market access for developing countries in the area of agriculture stating India's applied tariffs for exports in developed countries was very low. Nath claims that this is due to continued imports through schemes like EPCG (Export Promotion Capital Goods Scheme) where tariffs are not levied.

Competing in the world market
Nath disagrees with the Trade protectionist outlook displayed among struggling countries and considers it to be the wrong response to a financial crisis. He has pushed for stronger international co-operation in India, such as expanding on Indo-German relations. Nath stated for a mutually beneficial relationship with Germany to exist it must rely on using both countries' manufacturing strengths. He outlined focus areas of production including telecom, engineering, environmental technology, chemicals, pharmaceuticals and food processing, and renewable energy. Kamal Nath describes India's entrepreneurial spirit and the countries' potential for global commerce growth in his book India's Century.

Kamal Nath on infrastructure development

Nath emphasises the need for infrastructure development in India with projects like the Delhi-Mumbai Industrial Corridor, a 90 billion dollars industrial development project. The DMIC proposes major expansion of infrastructure and industry and aims to develop an industrial zone across six states in India. Within the first five years of the project expectations are set at doubling employment potential, tripling industrial output, and quadrupling exports from the region.

Public–private partnership (PPP)

Kamal Nath advocates a PPP model on completing such ambitious projects like the DMIC and other infrastructure development projects. He references success with PPP models implemented in India's Metro operations.

Positions held

Controversies

Rice export accusations 
In 2007, during Kamal Nath's tenure as Commerce minister, an Empowered Group of Ministers that included Nath, Pranab Mukherjee, and Sharad Pawar helped lift a ban on the export of non-basmati rice. It was alleged that PSUs involved in export of this rice to Africa outsourced the efforts to domestic private companies. It is claimed that the private companies made large profits while the PSUs reported small margins.
	
He was charge sheeted in the Hawala scandal and denied a ticket by the Congress itself in 1996, wherein he made his wife Alka Nath stand for elections from the Chhindwara (Lok Sabha constituency).

1984 Anti Sikh Genocide
On 1 November 1984, a day after Indira Gandhi's assassination, anti Sikh Massacre broke out in Delhi as a result of which at least 2,733 people were killed by mobs. Nanavati commission led by a retired Judge of the Supreme Court of India investigated the riots some 25 years after it happened but were unable to find surviving evidence. The commission found that the allegations of his involvement lacked sufficient evidence as of 2008–09. Nath was not charged and he later stated that he was "fully absolved" by the Nanavati Commission.

2019 Income Tax Raid
The Income Tax Department, an Indian government agency, conducted inspections at the properties of relatives and aides of CM Kamal Nath in April 2019. Kailash Vijayvargiya tweeted about the estimation of the detected illegal cash before the Central Board of Direct Taxes' statement on the raids, Kamal Nath's media coordinator Narender Saluja in turn said the raids were orchestrated to malign his party.

Misogynistic comments
While addressing a rally during the 2020 Madhya Pradesh By-Election, Nath referred to MP cabinet minister Imarti Devi as 'Item' (colloquially considered as a sexually provocative word/objectification of women). His comments were heavily criticised by several leaders and activists. The Bharatiya Janata Party and the National Commission for Women approached to the Election Commission of India to complain about the derogatory remarks against the Scheduled Caste candidate and demanded to ban him from campaigning during the by-polls.

On 30 October 2020, the Election Commission of India revoked the star campaigner status of Kamal Nath citing repeated violation of Model Code of Conduct while campaigning for the elections.

Personal life 
Kamal Nath was born in 1946 In Kanpur to Mahendra Nath and Lila Nath. He has two sister, Anita Puri and Rita Jolly. He married Alka Nath on 27 January 1973 and has two sons, Nakul Nath and Bakul Nath. The family has owned several successful businesses including real estate, aviation, plantations and hospitality. Alka Nath and Nakul Nath have both been elected to India's parliament.

Awards and recognition 
 In 2006 Kamal Nath received an Honorary Doctorate from Jabalpur's Rani Durgavati University for his contributions to the public sector.
 Kamal Nath was named the FDI Personality of the Year 2007 by the FDI magazine and the Financial Times Business for his "Active efforts to attract foreign businesses to India, boost exports, and promote trade and investment".
 In 2008 he was honoured with the title "Business Reformer of the year" by The Economic Times.
 In November 2012, he received the "ABLF Statesman Award" at the Asian Business Leadership Forum Awards 2012.

See also 
 Kamal Nath ministry

References

External links

Official biographical sketch in Parliament of India website
Anti-Sikh riots: Eyewitness testimonies named Kamal Nath, Nanavati panel said not possible to indict him, Indian Express, 18 December 2018

|-

|-

|-

|-

|-

|-

1946 births
Living people
Indian National Congress politicians
People from Madhya Pradesh
The Doon School alumni
India MPs 2004–2009
Members of the Cabinet of India
People from Chhindwara
St. Xavier's College, Kolkata alumni
University of Calcutta alumni
India MPs 1980–1984
India MPs 1984–1989
India MPs 1989–1991
India MPs 1991–1996
India MPs 1998–1999
India MPs 1999–2004
India MPs 2009–2014
Lok Sabha members from Madhya Pradesh
India MPs 2014–2019
Pro tem Speakers of the Lok Sabha
Chief Ministers of Madhya Pradesh
Commerce and Industry Ministers of India
Madhya Pradesh MLAs 2018–2023